Thwaites may refer to:

Companies
 Thwaites Brewery
 Thwaites & Reed, oldest clockmakers in the world

Surnames 
Ann Thwaites (1789–1866) English philanthropist also known as Mrs Thwaites, Ann Thwaytes and Mrs Thwaytes
Brenton Thwaites (born 1989), Australian actor
Bryan Thwaites (born 1923), English applied mathematician, educationalist and administrator
Caitlin Thwaites (born 1986), Australian netball and volleyball player
Daniel Thwaites, Sr. (1777–1843), founder of Thwaites Brewery
Daniel Thwaites (1817–1888), English brewer and Liberal Party politician
David Thwaites (born 1976), British actor
Denis Thwaites (1944–2015), English professional footballer who plays outside left
Edward Thwaites (1667–1711), English scholar of the Anglo-Saxon language
F. J. Thwaites (1908–1979), Australian novelist
George Henry Kendrick Thwaites (1812–1882), British botanist and entomologist
Guy Thwaites (born 1971), British professor
John Barrass (Jack) Thwaites (1902–1986), Tasmanian bushwalker and conservationist 
John Anthony Thwaites (1909–1981), British art critic and author
John Thwaites (Australian politician) (born 1955)
John Thwaites (British politician) (1815–1870)
Kate Thwaites (born 1980), Australian politician)
Michael Thwaites (1915–2005), Australian academic, poet, intelligence officer, and activist
Reuben Gold Thwaites (1853–1913), American historical writer
Robinson Thwaites (1807-1884), English mechanical engineer and mill-owner
Ronald Thwaites (born 1945), Jamaican minister and politician; see Constituencies of Jamaica
Thomas Thwaites (disambiguation)
 Thomas Thwaites (civil servant) (c.1435–1503), English civil servant
 Thomas Thwaites (cricketer) (1910-2000), Australian cricketer
 Thomas Thwaites (designer), British designer
Thomas Thwaites (designer), British designer and writer
William Thwaites (1868–1947), former Commander of the British Army of the Rhine

Places 
Thwaites, Bradford, a U.K. location
Thwaites, Cumbria, England
Thwaites, Ontario, Canada
Thwaites Glacier, Antarctica
Thwaites Ice Shelf, Antarctica

See also 
Thwaite (disambiguation)